Phi Alpha Delta Law Fraternity, International ( or P.A.D.) is the largest professional law fraternity in the United States. Founded in 1902, P.A.D. has since grown to 717 established pre-law, law, and alumni chapters and over 330,000 initiated members. Application for membership to Phi Alpha Delta is available to undergraduate students, law school students, lawyers, judges, and politicians.

Three of the sitting Justices of the United States Supreme Court are members of P.A.D. From 1964 to 1968, Tom C. Clark, Associate Justice of the Supreme Court of the United States, served as Supreme Vice Justice of the Fraternity. Seven U.S. Presidents have likewise been members of P.A.D.

Organization and government 
Pursuant to the Fraternity Policy Manual and By-Laws of Phi Alpha Delta Law Fraternity, International, the supreme governing body of the Fraternity is the International Chapter in Convention Assembled. The International Chapter is composed of up to two delegates (and alternates) from each active law school and alumni chapter, up to two alumni members at-large from each district, each District Justice, each International Officer, and each former Supreme or International Justice in attendance. Conventions are convened once every two years, usually in August.

Between conventions, the Fraternity is governed by an International Executive Board (IEB) composed of the International Justice, the International Vice Justice, the International Secretary, the International Treasurer, the International Marshal, and 4 Members at-Large. An International Tribunal composed of the Chief Tribune and two Associate Tribunes hold judicial authority within the Fraternity.  All 12 International Officers are elected at Biennial Conventions.

For organization purposes, the Fraternity is geographically divided into thirty-three districts covering North America. For each district, the International Justice, with the advice and consent of the IEB, appoints a District Justice to serve as regional coordinator and work with Law School and Alumni Chapters within their district. Each District Justice may have one or more Assistant District Justice(s) to assist them in their work. District Justices are appointed, volunteer positions.

History 
Phi Alpha Delta Law Fraternity, International, is a professional fraternity composed of pre-law and law students, legal educators, attorneys, judges, and government officials.

Baird's Manual (20th ed.) reports that a short-lived predecessor group that informally served law students, Lambda Epsilon, had formed in Chicago in 1897. It existed until November 8, 1902, at which time this local group was reorganized into Phi Alpha Delta.

Phi Alpha Delta was founded on November 8, 1902, to promote professional competency and achievement within the legal profession. Today, P.A.D. is the world's largest law fraternity with 206 law school chapters, 99 alumni chapters and 316 Pre-Law chapters in the United States (including Puerto Rico), Canada and Mexico.

P.A.D. was the first law fraternity to admit members of all races, creeds, colours, religions and national origins.

Phi Alpha Delta became the first law fraternity to admit women in September 1970. In 1972 Phi Delta Delta Law Fraternity for women was, by joint action, merged into Phi Alpha Delta. P.A.D. is the only law fraternity to admit undergraduate students interested in the law. P.A.D. also sponsors an annual International Pre-Law Conference and Mock Trial Competition. P.A.D. is the only law fraternity to receive federal funding from the U.S. Department of Justice for its Law Related Education program.

P.A.D. hosts a "Senior Transition Program", aimed to help undergraduate seniors transition from the life of undergraduate studies to law school.

Prominent members of the fraternity 
U.S. Presidents
William H. Taft (1909–1913)
Woodrow Wilson (1913–1921)
Warren G. Harding (1921–1923)
Harry S. Truman (1945–1953)
Jimmy Carter (1977–1981)
Bill Clinton (1993–2001)
Joe Biden (2021–present)

U.S. Supreme Court Justices
William H. Taft (1921–1930)
Tom C. Clark (1949–1967)
Warren E. Burger (1969–1986)
Ruth Bader Ginsburg (1993–2020)
Stephen G. Breyer (1994–2022)
Samuel Alito (2006–present)
Sonia Sotomayor (2009–present)
Elena Kagan  (2010–present)

See also 
 Order of the Coif (honor society, law)
 The Order of Barristers (honor society, law; litigation)
 Phi Delta Phi (honor society, law; was a professional fraternity)
 Alpha Phi Sigma (honor society, criminal justice)
 Lambda Epsilon Chi (honor society, paralegal)
 Professional fraternities and sororities

References 

Directory of Membership 2006 - Phi Alpha Delta Law Fraternity, International, Harris Connect, Inc. 2006.
 In re Application of Henry M. Day, et al., 181 ILL. 73, 54 N.E. 646, 1899 Ill. LEXIS 3011 (1899).
 Judice, C. Raymond, Phi Alpha Delta Law Fraternity: A History, 1968.
 The Political Graveyard website

External links

Guide to the University of Chicago, Phi Alpha Delta Law Fraternity Records 1955-1961 at the University of Chicago Special Collections Research Center

Professional legal fraternities and sororities in the United States
Student organizations established in 1902
Legal organizations based in the United States
Professional Fraternity Association
1902 establishments in Ohio
1902 establishments in Michigan